Crimes of the Future is the fourth studio album by SMP, released on April 19, 2004 by Music Ration Entertainment.

Reception
DJ Arcanus of Lollipop Magazine called Crimes of the Future the band's greatest achievement, calling it "danceable, aggressive, diverse, and complex" and "nearly every song is an intense and effective punch in the gut."

Track listing

Personnel
Adapted from the Crimes of the Future liner notes.

SMP
 Jason Bazinet – lead vocals, drums, programming

Additional performers
 Wade Alin – additional programming, mixing (1-6, 8-10, 12, 14)
 Paul J. Furio – programming, additional keyboards, additional vocals and mixing (15)
 Dee Madden – additional vocals (16)
 Chris Roy – guitar (1, 2, 3, 6, 9, 10)

Production and design
 Rob Anonymous – recording (1-6, 8 to 10, 12, 14)
 Garrick Antikajian – cover art, illustrations, design, mixing and additional programming (7, 11, 13)
 Roger Sprague – mastering
 The Sultan – mixing (16)

Release history

References

External links 
 Crimes of the Future at iTunes
 Crimes of the Future at Discogs (list of releases)

2004 albums
SMP (band) albums